The Minho or Miño is the longest river in Galicia, sharing the border with Portugal, with a length of . By discharge, it is the fourth river of the Iberian peninsula, after the Douro, Ebro, and Tagus.

The Minho waters vineyards and farmland, is used to produce hydroelectric power, and also delineates a section of the Spanish–Portuguese border. In ancient English maps, it appears as Minno.

The source of the Minho lies north of Lugo in Galicia, in a place called Pedregal de Irimia. The river has been harnessed in reservoirs from Portomarín to Frieira.

Passing Ourense, there is one major dam at Frieira near the town of Ribadavia, which is famous for its Ribeiro DOP wine (called after the name of the region). There the Minho averages 316 m3/s of discharge. Later on, the river flows in a southwest direction until reaching the Portuguese border near Melgaço.

After  through Galicia, the Minho sets the border to Portugal for about other , mainly towards the west. The valley is a lush, green agricultural area where the land is used to produce corn, potatoes, cabbage, even kiwi fruit, or just grass, depending on the time of year, and everywhere edging the fields, rivers and gardens, wherever there is space, the vines which produce the light, slightly sparkling "Vinho Verde" and the Ribeiro wine, both peculiar to this area. The very best of these wines, Alvarinho in Portuguese or Albariño in Spanish and Galician, is produced in the area around Monção, Arbo, and Melgaço.

Passing the medieval towns of Melgaço and Monção, the Minho divides the Spanish Tui and Portuguese Valença do Minho, towns that guarded an important bridge for road and rail. Both towns preserve fortifications and are national monuments. The Minho reaches the Atlantic between the Galician A Guarda and the Portuguese Caminha, with an average discharge of 420 m3/s.

Geography

This lagoon is located in the same province. Although wrong, is historically considered as its birthplace. The Minho flows through the Galician massif and Cantabrian Mountain range and the mountains of Leon, two of the rainiest areas of the Iberian Peninsula, being one of the main rivers of the Atlantic slope.

All its upper course has been declared a Biosphere Reserve.

Its main tributaries are the Sil, Neira, Avia, Barbantiño, Búbal, Arnoya rivers.

Etymology 
According to E. Bascuas, "Miño", registered as Minius and Mineus, is a form belonging to the old European hydronymy, and derived from the Indoeuropean  root *mei- 'walk, go'.

Legends, traditions and superstitions
The story tells the oral tradition of Galician mythological characters that were living in the basin of the Rio Minho, such as feiticeiras (witches) who lived in the same river, the Xarcos who dwelt in wells located throughout the watershed and fish-men who were amphibious with the possibility of living both on land and in water.

Tributaries

Right
 Pontevedra
 Río Tamuxe (also called Carballas, Carballo or Carvallo)
 Río Pego
 Río Cereixo da Brinha
 Río Furnia (also called Forcadela)
 Río Louro
 Río Caselas
 Río Tea
 Río Uma
 Río Deva (there is another Deva River on the left bank)
 Río Ribadil
 Río Cea
 Ourense
 Río Avia
 Río Barbantiño
 Río Bubal
 Lugo
 Río Asma
 Río Narón
 Río Ferreira
 Río Mera
 Río Narla
 Río Ladra
 Río Támoga
 Río Anllo

Left
 Portugal
 Rio Mouro
 Rio Gadanha
 Rio Coura
 Ourense
 Río Deva
 Río Arnoia
 Río Barbaña
 Río Lonia
 Sil River
 Lugo
 Río Sardiñeira
 Río Loio
 Río Neira
 Río Chamoso
 Río Robra (also called río Santa Marta)
 Río Lea
 Río Azúmar

See also
 List of rivers of Spain
 Rivers of Galicia

References

External links

 
  El Rio Miño y ciudad de Tui
 The Minho River Wine Tour
 Minho River border

 
Natura 2000 in Portugal